Wobé (Ouobe) is a Kru language spoken in Ivory Coast. It is one of several languages in a dialect continuum called Wèè (Wɛɛ).

Tone
Wobé is known for claims that it has the largest number of tones (fourteen) of any language in the world. However, this has not been confirmed by other researchers, many of whom believe that some of these will turn out to be sequences of tones or prosodic effects, though the Wèè languages in general do have extraordinarily large tone systems.

The fourteen posited tones are:

Numerals

Wobe has a quinary, decimal system, and it is one of the only two Kru languages which have adopted the decimal system.

References

Languages of Ivory Coast
Wee languages